Funny Wonder was the name of a pre-War humorous comic published in the United Kingdom by Amalgamated Press. It was part of a long string of related titles which stretched from 1892 to 1953, known by a variety of additional titles, including Wonder, Jester, Jester and Wonder,  Jolly Jester, Penny Wonder, and Halfpenny Wonder. There were two main (overlapping) runs, the first stretching from 1892 to 1940, and the second from 1912 to 1953; the first run being merged into the second. The most well-known, and longest-running single version, was Funny Wonder series 3, which ran 1,404 weekly issues from 1914 to 1942. (During this same stretch, the original run title was mostly known as Jester.) Notable creators who worked on the comic include Reg Parlett and Roy Wilson.

Publication history

First run (1892–1940) 

Wonder started out as a broadsheet, publishing 27 issues in from 30 July 1892 to 27 January 1893. At that point, in January 1893, the title became Funny Wonder, restarted its numbering and becoming a weekly tabloid that published 325 issues until March 1899.

Keeping the title, The Funny Wonder restarted its numbering, publishing 109 issues from  March 1899 to  21 April 1901. After a hiatus of a little more than a month, the publication changed the title back to Wonder (keeping the same numbering), publishing 24 more issues from 1 June 1901 until issue #133 on 9 November 1901.

The second iteration of the comic published a total of 2,010 consecutively-numbered issues from 1901 to 1940. Keeping the title Wonder, the publication again restarted from #1, published 25 issues from 16 November 1901 to 3 May 1902, when it became Wonder and Jester for 2 issues. Flipping its name to Jester and Wonder, the title published 506 issues from 24 May 1902 to 20 January 1912. With issue #534 (27 January 1912), the title became simply Jester, publishing 465 issues until 18 December 1920 when it became Jolly Jester with issue #999. The comic published an additional 165 issues under that name until 15 January 1924, when it changed back to Jester, publishing 847 more issues from 23 February 1924 until 18 May 1940. The first run concluded with issue #2010, at which point it merged into the title's second run (at that point called Funny Wonder).

Second run (1912–1953) 

Meanwhile, back in 1912 — just as Wonder and Jester dropped the "Wonder" name to become simply Jester — a new title, The Penny Wonder, began. The Penny Wonder published 47 issues from 10 January 1912 to 28 December 1912 before it restarted (again, at #1) as Wonder, publishing 64 issues from 4 January 1913 to 21 March 1914.

Changing title to Halfpenny Wonder and restarting the numbering one more, it published issues #1–39 from 28 March 1914 to 19 December 1914, before it changed names again. With the issue of 26 December 1914, the title once again became Funny Wonder, publishing 1,404 issues until 16 May 1942.

Funny Wonder was the first of Amalgamated Press' comics to have its own annuals, which ran from the edition dated 1935 until the one dated 1941, when it was ended due to the effects of World War II.

In May 1940, Funny Wonder absorbed Jester (which had previously been included as a pull-out section in overseas editions). With the issue of 30 May 1942, Funny Wonder changed titles again, back to Wonder, publishing 317 issues from May 1942 to 12 September 1953, when it merged with Radio Fun.

Content

First run 
Like other early comics, The Funny Wonder/Wonder was satirical in nature.

Strips 
 Freddy Pieface and Slim Jim (1890s)
 The Comical Capers of Constable Cuddlecook (1930s)
 Basil and Bert, Our Very Private Detectives (1930s)

Second run 
This version of the comic aimed much more at children. As with other similar publications of the era, it was roughly 50% comics and 50% text features. In 1926 Funny Wonder began to feature Charlie Chaplin on the cover.

Strips 
 Bertie Blobbs originally by Donald Newhouse
 Bob Harriday — Western strip
 Charlie Chaplin (1915–1944) by Bertie Brown
 Danny and Domino by Freddie Adkins
 Frolics and Fun with Mustava Bunn by Reg Parlett
 George the Jolly Gee-Gee — continued in Radio Fun
 Grandad Jones — The Youth with Old Bones
 The Marmaduke and His Ma by Wally Robertson
 Milly — The Merry Maid of All Work by Reg Parlett
 Nougat the Nig (1920s) by Freddie Adkins
 Pitch and Toss, Our Saucy Shipwrecked Mariners, originally by Joe Hardman; later by Donald Newhouse and then Roy Wilson and Reg Parlett
 Pranks in the Park
 Private Muggins by Roy Wilson (post-1945)
 Roy Rogers
 The Sacred Eye of Satpura by George Heath — adventure strip
 Sheriff Shucks of Shotgun City
 Sweet Rosie O'Grady

Timeline

References

Sources 
1892–1899
 
 

1899–1901 series
 
 

1901–1940 series
 
 
 
 
 
 

1912–1914
 
 

1914–1953 series 
 
 
 

Fleetway and IPC Comics titles
Comics magazines published in the United Kingdom
Defunct British comics
Comic strips started in the 1890s
1901 comics endings
1892 in comics
Magazines established in 1892
Magazines disestablished in 1901
1914 comics debuts
1942 comics endings
Magazines established in 1914
Magazines disestablished in 1942
British humour comics
Gag-a-day comics
Defunct magazines published in the United Kingdom
Magazines about comics